Tia Sáng ('The Spark') may refer to:
 Tia Sáng (1991 magazine), the science and technology Vietnamese-language magazine created in 1991 under MOST.
 Tia Sáng (1938 newspaper), the Trotskyist Vietnamese-language newspaper created in 1938 by the October group.